Italia's Got Talent is the Italian version of the international Got Talent series. The pilot episode was aired on 12 December 2009 on Canale 5 and it was seen by 5.3 million people. After this episode, Mediaset decided to hold on this show with a full-length season. The first season started on 12 April 2010 with high ratings and continued broadcasting. Rudy Zerbi, Maria De Filippi, and Gerry Scotti are the three judges.

The sixth series (2015) will face many changes. It has been aired by pay-TV Sky Uno, the entertainment-purposed channel of Sky Italy, owned by News Corporation. The host is Spanish-born Italian actress and model Vanessa Incontrada. No judges from the previous series have been confirmed: the new panel face the arrival of actor Claudio Bisio, actress and comedian Luciana Littizzetto, singer Nina Zilli and YouTube star Frank Matano. Talents are competing for €100,000. The final has been simulcast by Sky Uno and Cielo.

In the ninth series (2018) the judging panel have been changed. Singer-songwriter Nina Zilli has been replaced by Olympic Swimmer Federica Pellegrini and Actress-Comedian Luciana Littizzetto will be replaced by Mara Maionchi. Claudio Bisio and Frank Matano will stay on the show with Lodovica Comello.

The seventh season, starting in March 2016, is being aired in simulcast on Sky Uno and TV8, a brand-new free channel of Sky Italia, together with Planet's Got Talent, and a new host, Lodovica Comello. Starting with the thirteenth season, the show will air on Disney+.

Season 1 (2009–2010)

Final

Ratings

Season 2 (2011)

Final

Ratings

Season 3 (2012)

Final

Ratings

Season 4 (2013)

Final

Ratings

References

External links
 
 
 

Got Talent
Italian game shows
Italian reality television series
Italian music television series
Television series by Fremantle (company)
2009 Italian television series debuts
2000s Italian television series
2010s Italian television series
Italian television series based on British television series
Canale 5 original programming
Disney+ original programming